Arnold Budimbu (born 20 February 1995) is a German professional footballer who plays as a midfielder for Fortuna Köln.

Career
Budimbu made his professional debut for MSV Duisburg in the DFB-Pokal on 11 August 2019 in the home match against Greuther Fürth. After two years at Duisburg, he moved back to TSV Steinbach Haiger on 3 February 2021.

Personal life
Born in Germany, Budimbu is of Congolese descent.

Career statistics

References

External links

1995 births
Living people
Sportspeople from Bochum
Footballers from North Rhine-Westphalia
German footballers
German sportspeople of Democratic Republic of the Congo descent
Association football midfielders
1. FC Köln II players
Rot-Weiß Oberhausen players
FC Schalke 04 II players
TSV Steinbach Haiger players
MSV Duisburg players
1. FC Phönix Lübeck players
Regionalliga players
SC Fortuna Köln players
3. Liga players